Quiet Days in Clichy is a 1990 erotic drama film directed by Claude Chabrol. It is based on the 1956 autobiographical novel Quiet Days in Clichy by Henry Miller.

The novel was previously adapted into a 1970 Danish film.

Plot
American Henry Miller enjoys a wide variety of sexual escapades while also working hard to establish himself as a serious writer in Paris.

Cast

References

External links 

1990 films
1990s biographical films
French biographical films
English-language French films
English-language German films
Films directed by Claude Chabrol
Films set in the 1930s
Films based on American novels
Remakes of Danish films
Biographical films about writers
Films based on works by Henry Miller
1990s English-language films
1990s French films